SPPF may refer to:

 Seychelles People's Progressive Front, a political party in Seychelles
 Société des producteurs de phonogrammes en France; see SourceForge
 Shared Packed Parse Forest, see Earley parser